Blaschke is a German surname. Notable people with the surname include:

Hugo Blaschke, (1881–1959), German dental surgeon, Hitler's personal dentist
Jarin Blaschke, American cinematographer
Jayme Lynn Blaschke (born 1969), American journalist and author of science fiction, fantasy and related non-fiction
Wilhelm Blaschke (1885–1962), Austro-Hungarian differential and integral geometer
Hanns Blaschke, (1896–1971), Austrian NSDAP politician

See also
17637 Blaschke, a main-belt asteroid

German-language surnames
Surnames from given names